Indulis Bērziņš (born 4 December 1957) is a Latvian historian and diplomat, former minister for foreign affairs of the Republic of Latvia.

Biography 
He was born in the town Madona.

In 1981, Indulis Bērziņš graduated with a degree in history from University of Latvia. From 1981 to 1990, he was a history lecturer at the University of Latvia and Latvian University of Agriculture. Bērziņš was an active member of the social political organization Popular Front of Latvia, and he was actively involved in the restoration of independence of the Republic of Latvia. As an elected member of the Supreme Council of the Republic of Latvia Bērziņš voted twice in favour of restoration of Latvia’s independence, on 4 May 1990 and 21 August 1991. From 1990 to 1999, he served as Member of Parliament representing Latvia’s Way political party. In his career as a Member of the Latvian Parliament (MP), Bērziņš has served in several key positions, including as Deputy Speaker of the Parliament, chairman of the Foreign Affairs Committee, head of the delegation to the North Atlantic Alliance, and head of the delegation to the Inter-Parliamentary Union.

From 16 July 1999 to 7 November 2002, Bērziņš was Latvia’s minister of foreign affairs. This period was of significant importance to Latvia in reaching several crucial milestones in the process of accession to the European Union and NATO. Bērziņš was Head of Delegation of Latvia to the EU accession. Since 2002, he has served as Ambassador Extraordinary and Plenipotentiary of the Republic of Latvia to the Kingdom of Denmark (2002-2003), the United Kingdom (2004-2009), and the Republic of Austria (2009-2013). In this period, he has served as Latvia’s non-residing ambassador to Australia, New Zealand, Switzerland, Liechtenstein and Slovenia. Beginning in September 2015, Bērziņš served as Ambassador Extraordinary and Plenipotentiary of the Republic of Latvia to NATO in Brussels, Belgium.

Bērziņš is Commander of the Three Stars Order of the Republic of Latvia and Grand Officer of the Cross of Recognition of the Republic of Latvia. In 1997, he was decorated as Commander of the Ordre National du Merit of France. In 2013, he received a Decoration of Honour for Services to the Republic of Austria.

References 

1957 births
Living people
Communist Party of Latvia politicians
Popular Front of Latvia politicians
Latvian Way politicians
Ministers of Foreign Affairs of Latvia
Deputies of the Supreme Council of the Republic of Latvia
Deputies of the 5th Saeima
Deputies of the 6th Saeima
Deputies of the 7th Saeima
Latvian diplomats
Ambassadors of Latvia to Denmark
Ambassadors of Latvia to the United Kingdom
Ambassadors of Latvia to Australia
University of Latvia alumni
Academic staff of the University of Latvia
Recipients of the Cross of Recognition